Rajendra Kharel is a Nepalese politician. He was elected to the Pratinidhi Sabha in the 1999 election on behalf of the Nepali Congress. Later he joined Sher Bahadur Deuba's break-away party, Nepali Congress (Democratic).

References

Year of birth missing (living people)
Living people
Nepali Congress politicians from Bagmati Province
Nepali Congress (Democratic) politicians
Nepal MPs 1999–2002
Khas people